The 1903 British Isles tour to South Africa was the fifth tour by a British Isles rugby team and the third to South Africa. It is retrospectively classed as one of the British Lions tours, as the Lions naming convention was not adopted until 1950.

Led by Scotland's Mark Morrison and managed by Johnny Hammond the tour took in 22 matches. Of the games three were test matches, played against the South Africa national rugby union team. The British Isles drew the first two test matches and lost the final encounter.

Having lost only one game out of 40 matches in the previous two tours of South Africa, the British Isles team were truly tested by the South African rugby nation on this tour. Of the 22 games played, the tourist won eleven, drew three and lost eight. Unlike past teams, the British Isles three-quarter line was not seen as the team's strongest asset and more reliance was placed in the pack. Of the backs, only Reg Skrimshire, the only Welsh player selected, was judged to have shown any true flair; while the pack failed to live up to expectations, even when led by Scottish power-house David Bedell-Sivright.

The tour included Louis Leisler Greig, who later became well known as a royal equerry, friend of George VI and became a prominent member of the far right January Club.

Touring party

Manager: Johnny Hammond

Full Backs
 Edward Montague Harrison (Guy's Hospital/Middlesex/Barbarian F.C.)

Three-Quarters
 Alfred Hind (Cambridge University/Leicester/Midland Counties)
 Ian Davidson (North of Ireland)
 Gilbert Collett (Gloucestershire/Cambridge University)
 Reg Skrimshire (Newport/Blackheath F.C./Kent/Barbarian F.C.)
 Edward Forbes Walker (Lennox/Middlesex)

Half backs
 Louis Greig (Cambridge University/Glasgow Academicals/United Services and )
 John Imrie Gillespie (Edinburgh Academicals and )
 Robert Miln Neill (Edinburgh Academicals and )
 Patrick Hancock (Richmond/Surrey)

Forwards
 Mark Morrison (Royal HSFP and ) (captain)
 David Bedell-Sivright (Cambridge University and )
 William Patrick Scott (West of Scotland and )
 William Cave (Cambridge University/Blackheath F.C./Kent)
 J.C. Hosack (Edinburgh Wanderers)
 Robertson Smyth (Dublin University and )
 Alfred Tedford (Malone RFC and )
 Joseph Wallace (Wanderers/Dublin University and )
 James Wallace (Wanderers/Dublin University)
 Frank Stout (Richmond/Barbarian F.C./Gloucester and )
 Thomas Alexander Gibson (Cambridge University)

Results

 Test matches

The matches
After playing the first two Tests in white shirts, South Africa wore a green jersey (supplied by Old Diocesan's Club) for the first time in their final Test at Newlands.

First Test

Second Test

Third Test

References

British Lions
British & Irish Lions tours of South Africa
British Lions Tour To South Africa, 1903
Lions
British